Narkatiaganj is a town and a notified area in West Champaran district in the Indian state of Bihar.

Overview
Narkatiaganj is a subdivision region in West Champaran district in the Indian state of Bihar. Narkatiaganj block has twenty seven Panchayats. The city is well connected by roads and railways to all major places of Bihar and neighbor states. It is situated on the Barauni–Gorakhpur, Raxaul and Jainagar railway lines.

Demographics
As of 2011 India census, Narkatiaganj had a population of 49,507 in 9083 households. Males constitute 53% of the population and females 43%. Narkatiaganj has an average literacy rate of 65%, lower than the national average of 74%, male literacy is 57.65% and female literacy is 42.34%. 15.7% of the population in Narkatiyaganj is under 6 years of age.

Climate

Notable people Belonging To The Region
 Manoj Bajpai - Indian actor 
Damodar Raao - Indian singer and composer
 Tufail Ahmad - Indian origin British journalist
 Satish Chandra Dubey - Politician
 Vikas Mishra - Indian economist, freedom fighter and former vice-chancellor of Kurukshetra University
 Krishna Kumar Mishra - Politician

Places of interest
Near Narkatiaganj is the historical Chanaki Garh, which is said to belong to Chanakya, the prime minister  of Chandragupta Maurya of the Mauryan dynasty. An Iron Pillar (also known as Ashoka Stambha) representing the history of India and commissioned by Ashoka, is another center of attraction.

See also 
 Narkatiaganj Junction 
 Narkatiaganj (Vidhan Sabha constituency)

References

Cities and towns in West Champaran district